The Young Slave is an Italian literary fairy tale written by Giambattista Basile in his 1634 work, the Pentamerone.

It is Aarne-Thompson type 709, Snow White; other variants include Bella Venezia and Myrsina. The tale is based in Italy, and is often cited as one of the first Snow White stories to exist.

Synopsis
A few girls competed to see who could jump over a rose bush without touching it. Lilla, the baron's sister, was the last to go. She almost cleared the bush, but knocked off a single rose petal, signifying her loss. However, wanting to win, she decided to swallow the petal and claim victory. That night, she became pregnant. She confided in her fairy friends about what had happened, confused because she was a virgin, but the fairies told her not to worry, because it was the rose petal itself that had impregnated her. Eventually she bore a daughter and named her Lisa.  The fairies gave Lilla gifts to commemorate the birth, but one twisted her ankle and accidentally cursed Lisa to die when she was seven. The cause of death would be by Lilla herself combing her daughters hair and forgetting about it, causing the comb to become poisonous and kill her. When Lisa turned seven, the curse became true, and Lilla fell ill. The lamenting mother put her daughter in seven crystal coffins and hid her away in a room. Before she died, she gave her brother the key to the room and made him promise not to open it.

He obeyed and, eventually, married. He was always out hunting, and during one of his trips, his wife opened the door and found the casket. Lisa had continued to age into a beautiful young girl and the casket grew with her. Jealous of the girl's beauty and believing that her husband would cheat on her with Lisa, the baroness pulled her out by her hair, which knocked out the comb and brought her back to life. She cut the girls hair, dressed her in rags and beat her everyday until her husband returned. When her uncle returned, he could not recognize her as his niece, and his wife took advantage of this. She claimed that her aunt had sent her the girl to be their slave, and that she was not to be loved. She forced the girl to do work around the house and continued to abuse her.

One day, the baron went to a fair and asked everyone for what they wanted him to bring back, including Lisa. His wife flew into a jealous rage, stating that she was not to be loved or put on their social level. Lisa then asked for a doll, a knife, and some pumice-stone, and cursed him to not be able to cross the river to return if he failed.  He indeed forgot them, but when the river swelled, it reminded him of her request, and he went back to buy her items. Lisa took them to the kitchen and told her life story to the doll, and then threatened to sharpen the knife on the stone and kill herself if the doll did not answer. Miraculously, the doll replied "Alright, I heard you! I'm not deaf!" Lisa continued this game with her doll over several days - threatening to kill herself with the knife if the doll did not reply.

By chance, the baron heard Lisa speaking to the doll one night. Recognizing the story of the rose bush, he broke down the door just before Lisa could stab herself with the knife. He asked her to retell the story, and she did, and he instantly knew that she was his niece. He embraced the girl and sent her away from the abusive home to one of his relatives, where she could recover. In a few months time, Lisa had once again regained her "goddess-like" beauty and was invited back to the home. The baron planned a great banquet for the kingdom and, when the meal was finished, asked Lisa to recount the horrors his wife had put her through. The people at the banquet were horrified and sobbing, angry at the baroness, until finally the baron banished his wife from his land and out of their lives forever. He found a handsome, loving husband for his niece of her choosing, and they lived happily ever after.

See also

 Snow White
 Gold-Tree and Silver-Tree
 La petite Toute-Belle

References

Further reading
 Tatar, Maria "The Fairest of Them All: Snow White and 21 Tales of Mothers and Daughters"

External links
 ATU Index - Folktale Classification Index (University of Missouri)

Young Slave
Young Slave
Female characters in fairy tales
ATU 400-459
ATU 700-749